Ernesto Horacio Crespo (8 December 1929 – 6 March 2019) was an Argentine Brigadier General (Lieutenant General) and former Chief of Staff of the Argentine Air Force.

Early life 

In 1982, Crespo, who was the commander of the Fourth Air Force Brigade at the time, was commanded to create, deploy, and command the South Air Force; the military organization that would control both Air Force and Argentine Navy air units that would later take part in the Falklands War.

From 1985 to 1989, he acted as Chief of Staff of the Air Force under presidency of Raúl Alfonsín. During the Carapintadas conflict within the Argentine Army, the Air Force under his command, stood in defense of the democratic government.

During his mandate, the Condor Program was revealed publicly, which was later discontinued in the early 1990s during the Carlos Menem presidency because of political pressure from the United States.

Death 

Crespo died on 6 March 2019, at the age of 89.

See also
Argentine air forces in the Falklands War

References
Argentine Airpower in the Falklands War
 Las relaciones peligrosas de la Fuerza Aérea

 

1929 births
2019 deaths
Argentine Air Force brigadiers
Argentine military personnel of the Falklands War